A difluorine complex is a molecular complex involving a difluorine molecule (F2) and another molecule. The first example was gold heptafluoride (AuF7). Instead of being a gold(VII) compound, AuF7 is an adduct of gold pentafluoride (AuF5) and F2.  This conclusion has been repeatedly supported by calculations.  Unlike dihydrogen complexes, which feature η2-H2, difluorine complexes feature "end-on" or η1-F2 ligand.

See also
dihydrogen complex

References

Fluorine compounds